Moamen Abouelanin (born 25 June 1986) is an Egyptian former basketball player. He played in Egypt for Al Ittihad Alexandria and Al Ahly. Abouelanin played with the Egyptian national team, where he participated at the 2014 FIBA Basketball World Cup.

References

1986 births
Living people
Egyptian men's basketball players
Power forwards (basketball)
Small forwards
2014 FIBA Basketball World Cup players
Al Ittihad Alexandria Club basketball players
Al Ahly basketball players